João Filipe Rabelo da Costa Silva (born 11 June 1988), known as João Filipe, is a Brazilian footballer who plays a central defender or a defensive midfielder for Tombense.

Career

Career statistics
As of 21 September 2011

Honours
São Paulo
Copa Sudamericana: 2012

External links
Profile at IG Esporte's website 

1988 births
Living people
Brazilian footballers
Association football defenders
Association football midfielders
Campeonato Brasileiro Série A players
Campeonato Brasileiro Série B players
Figueirense FC players
Botafogo de Futebol e Regatas players
São Paulo FC players
Clube Náutico Capibaribe players
Avaí FC players
Fluminense FC players
Atlético Clube Goianiense players
Footballers from Rio de Janeiro (city)